Michael Page (born September 23, 1938) is an American equestrian. At the 1964 Summer Olympics in Tokyo he won a silver medal in team eventing, and a bronze medal in individual eventing. He won a silver medal in team eventing at the 1968 Summer Olympics in Mexico City. Page was born in New York City, New York. Page served as head trainer of Kent School's equestrian team in Kent, Connecticut for twenty eight years, retiring in 2022. The Kent School Equestrian Center was dedicated as the Michael O. Page Equestrian Center in May of 2022 in recognition of his service.

References

External links
 

1938 births
Living people
American male equestrians
Olympic silver medalists for the United States in equestrian
Olympic bronze medalists for the United States in equestrian
Equestrians at the 1960 Summer Olympics
Equestrians at the 1964 Summer Olympics
Equestrians at the 1968 Summer Olympics
Medalists at the 1968 Summer Olympics
Medalists at the 1964 Summer Olympics
Pan American Games medalists in equestrian
Pan American Games gold medalists for the United States
Pan American Games silver medalists for the United States
Pan American Games bronze medalists for the United States
Equestrians at the 1959 Pan American Games
Equestrians at the 1963 Pan American Games
Equestrians at the 1967 Pan American Games
Medalists at the 1963 Pan American Games